Coty Wheeler (October 11, 1978) is an American mixed martial artist, who is perhaps best known for his four fight stint with now-defunct promotion World Extreme Cagefighting. Wheeler currently holds a professional record of 15–5.

Mixed martial arts career

World Extreme Cagefighting
Wheeler made his WEC debut on September 5, 2007, facing Ian McCall at WEC 30. He lost the fight via third-round TKO. In his second fight in the promotion, Wheeler faced Del Hawkins at WEC 32 on February 13, 2008. He won the fight via flying armbar submission.

After a one-year hiatus, Wheeler returned to WEC and a decision to Charlie Valencia at WEC 43 on October 10, 2009. Wheeler then faced Will Campuzano on January 10, 2010, at WEC 46, losing via unanimous decision.  The bout earned Fight of the Night honors.

Championships and accomplishments
World Extreme Cagefighting
Fight of the Night (One time) vs. Will Campuzano

Mixed martial arts record

|-
| Win
| align=center| 15–5
| Roberto Otero
| Submission (rear-naked choke)
| MWC 4 - Mescalero Warrior Challenge 4
| 
| align=center| 1
| align=center| 2:51
| Mescalero, New Mexico, United States
| 
|-
| Loss
| align=center| 14–5
| Freddie Lux
| Submission (rear-naked choke)
| MWC 2 - Mescalero Warrior Challenge 2
| 
| align=center| 1
| align=center| 4:28
| Mescalero, New Mexico, United States
| 
|-
| Loss
| align=center| 14–4
| Jens Pulver
| TKO (punches)
| MMA Fight Pit: Genesis
| 
| align=center| 2
| align=center| 1:59
| Albuquerque, New Mexico, United States
| 
|-
| Win
| align=center| 14–3
| Michael Chupa
| Submission (guillotine choke) 
| Mescalero Warrior Challenge
| 
| align=center| 2
| align=center| 0:16
| Mescalero, New Mexico, United States
| 
|-
| Win
| align=center| 13–3
| Ray Robinson
| TKO (punches)
| Jackson's MMA Series 2
| 
| align=center| 2
| align=center| 1:51
| Albuquerque, New Mexico, United States
| 
|-
| Loss
| align=center| 12–3
| Will Campuzano
| Decision (unanimous)
| WEC 46
| 
| align=center| 3
| align=center| 5:00
| Sacramento, California, United States
| 
|-
| Loss
| align=center| 12–2
| Charlie Valencia
| Decision (unanimous)
| WEC 43
| 
| align=center| 3
| align=center| 5:00
| San Antonio, Texas, United States
| 
|-
| Win
| align=center| 12–1
| Jasper Church
| TKO (punches)
| KOTC: New Breed
| 
| align=center| 1
| align=center| 0:28
| Mescalero, New Mexico, United States
| 
|-
| Win
| align=center| 11–1
| Ryan Axtel
| Submission (armbar)
| FW 16 - International
| 
| align=center| 1
| align=center| 1:10
| Albuquerque, New Mexico, United States
| 
|-
| Win
| align=center| 10–1
| Brandon Presnell
| Submission (guillotine choke)
| BATB - Brawl at the Beach
| 
| align=center| 1
| align=center| 1:15
| Jacksonville, North Carolina, United States
| 
|-
| Win
| align=center| 9–1
| Del Hawkins
| Submission (flying armbar)
| WEC 32: Condit vs. Prater
| 
| align=center| 2
| align=center| 1:54
| Rio Rancho, New Mexico, United States
| 
|-
| Loss
| align=center| 8–1
| Ian McCall
| TKO (punches)
| WEC 30
| 
| align=center| 3
| align=center| 4:34
| Las Vegas, Nevada, United States
| 
|-
| Win
| align=center| 8–0
| Cody Bell
| Submission (triangle choke)
| FW 15 - Rumble at Rt. 66 Casino
| 
| align=center| 1
| align=center| 1:55
| Albuquerque, New Mexico, United States
| 
|-
| Win
| align=center| 7–0
| Jeremy Kearby
| Submission (kneebar)
| FW 14 - Cinco de Whoop Ass
| 
| align=center| 1
| align=center| N/A
| Albuquerque, New Mexico, United States
| 
|-
| Win
| align=center| 6–0
| Cesar Rodriguez
| Submission (armbar)
| FW 13 - Fightworld 13
| 
| align=center| 1
| align=center| N/A
| Albuquerque, New Mexico, United States
| 
|-
| Win
| align=center| 5–0
| Justin Thrift
| Decision (unanimous)
| UWC 2 - Ultimate Warrior Challenge 
| 
| align=center| 3
| align=center| N/A
| Jacksonville, Florida, United States
| 
|-
| Win
| align=center| 4–0
| Anthony Grisato
| Submission (guillotine choke)
| FW 12 - Fightworld 12
| 
| align=center| 1
| align=center| 2:03
| Albuquerque, New Mexico, United States
| 
|-
| Win
| align=center| 3–0
| Vincent Ramos
| Submission 
| ROF 25 - Overdrive
| 
| align=center| 1
| align=center| 1:52
| Vail, Colorado, United States
| 
|-
| Win
| align=center| 2–0
| Robert Baker
| Submission 
| Fightworld 7
| 
| align=center| 1
| align=center| 3:28
| Albuquerque, New Mexico, United States
| 
|-
| Win
| align=center| 1–0
| Adam Bonilla
| TKO (punches) 
| Fightworld 6
| 
| align=center| 3
| align=center| 2:22
| Albuquerque, New Mexico, United States
|

References

External links
 

American male mixed martial artists
Mixed martial artists from New Mexico
Living people
Sportspeople from New Mexico
1978 births